Alexandra Aborneva (born ) is a Kazakhstani weightlifter, competing in the +75 kg category and representing Kazakhstan at international competitions. She competed at world championships, including at the 2015 World Weightlifting Championships. In 2013 Aborneva had a total of 3 gold medals revoked after she tested positive for banned performance-enhancing drugs.

Major results

References

Further reading 
 Kazakhstan Alexandra Aborneva wins gold in weightlifting at Asian Championship
 Kazakhstani weightlifter A. Aborneva won silver medal at IWF Russian Federation President's Cup
 Weightlifting: Kazakhstan wins 3rd gold at Asian Weightlifting Championship
 Vietnamese lifter wins two Asian golds after rivals detected of using dope
 Weightlifter Kim Van snatches Vietnam's first Asian gold

Kazakhstani female weightlifters
Weightlifters at the 2010 Asian Games
Weightlifters at the 2006 Asian Games
1986 births
Living people
Place of birth missing (living people)
Universiade medalists in weightlifting
Universiade silver medalists for Kazakhstan
Asian Games competitors for Kazakhstan
Medalists at the 2011 Summer Universiade
20th-century Kazakhstani women
21st-century Kazakhstani women